Emil Trenkov (born 27 June 1981) is a Bulgarian football player, currently playing for Vihren Sandanski as a defender. Trenkov is a right defender.

He started his career in Vihren Sandanski. After that played for Lokomotiv Sofia and again Vihren Sandanski. In July 2008 he signed with Lokomotiv Mezdra.

References

1981 births
Living people
Bulgarian footballers
First Professional Football League (Bulgaria) players
People from Sandanski
FC Lokomotiv 1929 Sofia players
OFC Vihren Sandanski players
PFC Lokomotiv Mezdra players
PFC Ludogorets Razgrad players
Association football defenders
Sportspeople from Blagoevgrad Province